The Best of Supercharge is a compilation album by UK R&B band Supercharge, released by Virgin Records in 1993. 
The album contains songs from Local Lads Make Good (1976), Horizontal Refreshment (1977) and Body Rhythm (1979).

Track listing
 Get Down Boogie - (Lange) - 3:16
 You've Gotta Get Up and Dance - (Lange) - 2:56
 Play Some Fire - (Donnely, Irving, Karski) - 3:33
 After the Show - (Donnely, Karski, Robertson) - 4:30
 Limbo Love - (Karski, Robertson) - 4:11
 Bad Time - (Karski) - 2:55
 Mess You Made - (Karski, Robertson) - 4:28
 We Both Believe in Love - (Lange) - 3:32
 I Think I'm Gonna Fall (In Love) - (Lange) - 8:48
 Four to the Floor - (Lange) - 3:24
 Taxi - (Lange) - 3:57
 Show Me How Real Your Love Is - (Lange) - 3:37
 Lonely and in Love - (Lange) - 3:33
 I Believe in You - (Bradshaw, Robertson) - 4:13
 Gimme Your Love - (Lange) - 3:42
 She Moved the Dishes First (Donnely, Robertson) - 7:15

1993 compilation albums
Albums produced by Robert John "Mutt" Lange
Virgin Records compilation albums